This is a list of characters in the Dying Earth series by Jack Vance.

The Dying Earth

Title characters
Guyal of Sfere is a young, wealthy man who is famous among his people for endlessly asking questions, due to a "void" in his mind which compels him to seek knowledge. Eventually, his father grants him magical boons to protect Guyal, so that he can seek the fabled Museum of Man in order to ask questions of the legendary, all-knowing Curator.
Liane the Wayfarer, a "bandit-troubadour", is a vain, venal, overconfident, sadistic, and thoroughly amoral adventurer. He travels about seeking wealth, wine, women, and song. In order to win the affections of a beautiful witch, he sets out to steal a tapestry from a mysterious entity called Chun the Unavoidable.
Mazirian, a greedy and heartless wizard, who will stop at nothing to obtain as much magical knowledge or power as possible. Although Mazirian, like Turjan, is capable of creating artificial life, his creations lack human intelligence. He imprisons Turjan in order to force him to give up his secrets.
Turjan is a wizard who lives in the castle of Miir, where he keeps a book containing the 100 spells, which remain in human knowledge. At the beginning of the novel, Turjan travels to an otherworldly realm to study under the wizard Pandelume, who can teach Turjan the secret of creating artificial life, as well as spells and sciences which are lost to human knowledge. Turjan's adventures often bring him into conflict with other wizards.
T'sais is an artificial woman created by Pandelume. Unfortunately, something went wrong in the process of her creation. As a result, T'sais is literally incapable of being pleased with anything or anyone, and reacts with disgust to the sight, sound, etc. of everything she perceives. She is consumed with uncontrollable disgust and hatred for all living creatures, including herself, and spends her time attempting to hunt and kill everything in sight (except Pandelume). After an encounter with T'sain, she decides to attempt to control her instinctual hatred, and asks Pandelume to send her to Earth. There, she joins Etarr in an attempt to cure their respective ills.
Ulan Dhor is the nephew of Prince Kandive, and a budding swordsman and wizard. He sets out to the city of Ampridatvir to recover a pair of ancient tablets, supposed to provide access into ancient knowledge and magic.

Other characters

Elai is a girl who shows kindness towards Ulan Dhor, during his journey to Ampridatvir. She is a member of the grey-clad worshippers of Cazdal. Ulan informs her of the truth about the city, and she serves as his guide and companion.
Etarr is a normal man who was unfortunate enough to fall in love with an evil witch. She used her mystical powers to exchange his face with that of a demon, cursing him with an unspeakably horrible face. However, Etarr is a kind man. After he offers help and hospitality to T'sais, she joins him on a journey to force his ex-lover to return his face. Although Etarr is not spoken of as a magician, he knows some spells which he uses to protect himself and T'sais.
Prince Kandive the Golden, as he is called, is a decadent and indolent monarch who rules the city of Kaiin. He is also a wizard of considerable power, from whom Mazirian stole the secrets of unnaturally long life. His age is unknown. Kandive finances the expeditions of his nephew, Ulan Dhor.
Pandelume is a mighty wizard who resides in the realm of Embelyon. Pandelume possesses knowledge of many things which are otherwise lost to mankind in Turjan's time, including the method of creating artificial life, of all the spells which have ever been invented, and of mundane sciences such as mathematics. However, he is not perfect or infallible; he created the flawed T'sais and needs Turjan to retrieve a magical relic for him in order to defeat an old foe. Although he has a physical presence, Pandelume is never seen by the other characters; apparently, the sight of him causes insanity or death.
Rogol Domedonfors: The last ruler of the city of Ampridatvir, unable to stop the endless rioting among the people of his city, caught up in a freak religious fervor, is mortally wounded, and devises two tablets containing the key to his lore. The city, once a bastion of science, sinks into barbarism. Thousands of years later, Ulan Dhor and Etai seek to steal these tablets from the temples. In doing so, they find the surprising true purpose behind their creation.
Shierl is the daughter of the Castellan of the Saponids. When the Saponids force Guyal to choose the most beautiful young woman in Saponce, he chooses Shierl, and inadvertently condemns her to be sacrificed to the demon Blikdak. Guyal and Shierl develop a relationship as the Saponids force him to escort her to the Museum of Man.
T'sain is a beautiful artificial human woman created by Turjan. T'sain was created from the same "pattern" that Pandelume used to create T'sais, but T'sain does not share her mental flaws. T'sain returns with Turjan to the Dying Earth, and later attempts to rescue Turjan from Mazirian.

Rhialto the Marvellous

The most powerful wizards of the 21st Aeon of the Dying Earth are banded together in an association, and mostly reside in the territories of Ascolais and Almery. Unlike other wizards of the Dying Earth, such as Turjan and Mazirian, these wizards possess nearly godlike power. With little effort, they can travel to the distant past or the furthest reaches of the universe, freeze time (a popular ability), prolong their lives for eons, change their shape and appearance, summon useful objects, and call forth numerous spells of protection, destruction, investigation, or simple amusement and experimentation. Much of their power comes from their ability to bind and control potent genie-like beings called sandestins, while they also derive power from their large stores of magical relics. The most highly prized are IOUN stones, mystical stones which they take as the spoils of their battles with the archveults. Their conduct toward one another is governed by a set of rules called the Blue Principles, because they're inscribed upon a blue stone which displays them through a sort of projector. This artifact was dislocated back into a remote age, and the search for it is fraught with one setback after another.

In Vance's Dying Earth cycle, most magic has been lost, there remaining but few more than a hundred spells to man's access. Each spell has to be memorized by stringent study, and, once used, is forgotten and has to be re-memorized. Even the strongest wizards can memorize no more than four of the greater and six of the lesser spells. Artifacts of great power from "antique days" occasionally turn up. These restrictions appear to be missing from the Cugel and Rhialto cycles.

Because the wizards are so powerful, they have little to fear except from one another and from powerful external threats such as the archveults. Thus, while the Blue Principles acts as a nonaggression pact and a defensive alliance, most of the time it serves as a social circle and gentleman's club. The members spend most of their time enjoying fine food and drink, courting ladies of the nearby kingdoms, conversing, and squabbling with one another over magical relics, or playing pranks on one another.

Rhialto the Marvellous, the titular wizard of the last book in the Dying Earth trilogy, and the primary focus of the stories involving the wizards of the 21st Aeon. Rhialto, like most of the others, is a wealthy and powerful wizard who rules an opulent estate, Falu. Also like most of his fellows, he enjoys epicurean pleasures and the company of beautiful women, but maintains no serious relationships. Normally appearing as a slim man with short black hair and austere features, he earned the title "The Marvellous" because of his reputation as a dandy who wears ostentatious, ornate clothing and is popular with women. Rhialto is ordinarily agreeable and carefree, but his fellow wizards regard him as somewhat supercilious.

Ildefonse is the elected "Preceptor" of the compact; he is invested with broad powers and effectively acts as a chairman or mediator of the compact’s meetings and members. Although Ildefonse is prone to hedonism and squabbling like his fellow wizards, he's generally much more temperate and level-headed than the others. His ordinary appearance is of a portly, bald middle-aged man with blue eyes and blond whiskers, which he habitually tugs at when vexed. Rhialto maintains a closer friendship with him than with any of the other wizards. His manse, a four-towered castle named Boumergarth, sits next to the River Scaum.

Ao of the Opals, "saturnine, with a pointed black beard and a caustic manner."

Barbanikos, "short and squat with a great puff of white hair."

Byzant the Necrope.

Darvilk the Miaanther, who wears a black domino mask for unknown reasons.

Dulce-Lolo, a "portly epicure."

Eshmiel, who delightfully affects an appearance which is, from head to toe, half-white and half-black, split vertically down the center. His home and possessions are similarly colored.

Gilgad, known for his clammy touch and his clothing, which is always rose-red.

Hache-Moncour, a vindictive wizard who is jealous of Rhialto's manner, and sets out to destroy his position due to a perceived slight on Rhialto's part. He wears the appearance of a nature-god with fine features and bronze curls.

Haze of Wheary Water. Haze appears as a wisp, an aquatic humanoid with green skin and orange willow-leaves for hair. Whether this is his true appearance, or just a magical affectation, is unknown.

Herark the Harbinger.

Hurtiancz, "short and burly," notorious for his short temper and irritability. He wears false teeth made from carved rubies.

Morreion, an exceptionally powerful amnesiac wizard who spent Aeons trapped far from Earth. Unlike most wizards, he eschews spells for simple gestures powered by "personal force."

Mune the Mage, who speaks little; unlike the other wizards, he is married, having four spouses.

Nahourezzin, a scholar from Old Romarth, a planet which appears in some of Vance's other works.

Panderleou, whose passion is collecting rare and exotic artifacts from various dimensions.

Perdustin, an especially secretive mage. He has no real friends, and refuses to reveal his place of residence.

Shrue, a diabolist. Thin and pale, he is a scholar of the demon-realms, and his fellow wizards find him agreeable but his witticisms disturbing.

Tchamast: In sharp contrast to the other wizards of the compact, Tchamast is a morose ascetic who is extremely mistrustful of women, so much that he only allows male insects into his home.

Teutch, who rarely speaks with his mouth, but uses magic to flick words from his fingertips. He is an Elder of the Hub, a philosophical academy which Cugel encountered on his own journeys, which holds that reality is like a wheel with an uncertain number of infinities as its "spokes". As an Elder, he is accorded control over a "private infinity".

Vermoulian the Dream-Walker, described as "peculiarly tall and thin, with a stately stride." Vermoulian lives in a magnificent floating palace which can travel to the far corners of the known universe, and can also view, enter, and record the dreams of others. He has a collection of "recordings" of beautiful women from ages past, stored in bottles. The women can be brought to life for a time, but once dismissed and recalled, they reappear with no memory of their last manifestation.

Zahoulik-Khuntze, known for his iron fingernails and toenails which are inscribed with strange runes.

Zanzel Melancthones, who is friendly with Rhialto and Ildefonse.

Zilifant, "robust of body, with long brown hair and a flowing beard."

Lists of literary characters
Characters in fantasy literature
Dying Earth